Lilyhurst is a small hamlet near Lilleshall and Sheriffhales in Shropshire. It has a population of roughly 20 people. It is part of the parish of Sheriffhales and contains a small industrial estate, holistic centre and garden centre.

Villages in Shropshire